Çavak is a village in the Mersin Province, Turkey. Administratively, it is part of Yenişehir district (which is an intracity district within Mersin city). The population of the village was 1,130 as of 2012.

References